Jamie Sives (born 14 August 1973) is a Scottish actor.

Sives was born in Lochend, Edinburgh. He studied at Leith Academy and worked as a scaffolder, as a postman, and as a club doorman in Edinburgh before turning to acting full-time. In 2014 he played the lead role of King James III of Scotland in the National Theatre of Scotland's production of James III, which was also part of the Edinburgh International Festival.

Filmography

Films

Television

Short films

References

External links

1973 births
Living people
Scottish male film actors
Scottish male television actors
Scottish male stage actors
Male actors from Edinburgh
People educated at Leith Academy